Scott Tucker may refer to:

 Scott Tucker (swimmer) (born 1976), American former swimmer
 Scott Tucker (businessman) (born 1962), American businessman, convicted racketeer, and racing driver
 Scott Tucker (conductor) (born 1976), American conductor